All of the Above is the second studio album by American hip hop artist J-Live. It was released on Coup d'État in 2002. The album cover pays homage to John Coltrane's Blue Train. The album peaked at number 28 on the Billboard Heatseekers Albums chart, as well as number 16 on the Independent Albums chart.

Critical reception

Brad Haywood of Pitchfork gave the album an 8.5 out of 10, noting that "[J-Live's] delivery is similar to Posdnuos, and his lyrical content is along the same lines: intelligent, educated, confident, and socially conscious." Josh Wells of HipHopDX said: "There are virtually no weak tracks on 78 minutes of music." Nathan Rabin of The A.V. Club praised it as being "as assured and consistent as his debut, but far more ambitious in scope".

Jason Birchmeier of AllMusic gave the album 4 out of 5 stars and called it "an album for a select audience that prefers intellect and understated beats over bombast, boasting, booty, and bluntedness."

Track listing

Charts

References

External links
 

2002 albums
J-Live albums
Albums produced by DJ Spinna